Llullaillaco is a dormant stratovolcano at the border of Argentina (Salta Province) and Chile (Antofagasta Region). It lies in the Puna de Atacama, a region of tall volcanic peaks on a high plateau close to the Atacama Desert, one of the driest places in the world. It is the second highest active volcano in the world after Ojos del Salado.

Llullaillaco formed during two different phases in the Pleistocene-Holocene out of dacitic lava flows. The oldest rocks are about 1.5 million years old. The youngest dated rocks were erupted 5,600 ± 250 years ago in the summit region, but there are reports of activity from the 19th century.

The mountain's first recorded climb was in 1950, but traces of earlier climbs and a number of archaeological sites were found on the mountain and at its feet; Llullaillaco marks the highest archaeological site in the world. In 1999, the mummified remains of three children, known as the Children of Llullaillaco, were found at its summit. They are presumed to have been human sacrifices. Mice have been observed in the summit region, they are the highest finding of a mammal in the world.

Name 

This name probably refers to the meltwater from snow, which flows down the slopes but then is absorbed into the soil; normally mountains are sources for water. It is possible that it instead refers to the precipitation regime, which starting from Llullaillaco becomes dominated by winter precipitation. Another translation in Aymara is "hot water".

Geography and geology 

Volcanism in the Andes is caused by the subduction of the Nazca Plate and the Antarctic Plate beneath the South America Plate. Volcanism does not occur along a continuous chain; there are four separate regions named: the Northern Volcanic Zone, the Central Volcanic Zone, the Southern Volcanic Zone, and the Austral Volcanic Zone. The formation of magma results from the release of water and other volatile material from the subducting plate, which is then injected into the above-lying mantle wedge. The volcanic zones are separated by areas where the subducting plate subducts at a flatter angle and volcanism is absent. The Peruvian flat slab between the Northern and the Central Volcanic Zones is associated with the subduction of the Nazca Ridge, the Pampean flat slab between the Central and the Southern Volcanic Zone is associated with the subduction of the Juan Fernandez Ridge, and the Patagonian volcanic gap between the Southern and the Austral Volcanic Zone is associated with the Chile Triple Junction.

About 178 volcanoes are found in the Andes, 60 of which have been active in historical times. In addition, large calderas and monogenetic volcanoes exist in the Andes.

Local setting 

Llullaillaco is part of the Central Volcanic Zone. At least 44 volcanic centres with historical activity and 18 large caldera-forming volcanoes have been identified in the Central Volcanic Zone. Volcanism in the Central Volcanic Zone mostly occurs on the Altiplano and the Cordillera Occidental. Large Miocene ignimbrites that cover large surfaces are also part of the regional geology. The Wadati-Benioff zone lies at  depth.

Llullaillaco is located in the northwestern Argentine Andes, towards the southern end of the Puna. It lies in the Puna de Atacama, a region of very high volcanic peaks on a high plateau close to the Atacama Desert, one of the driest places in the world. The border between Argentina (Salta Province) and Chile crosses the volcano.

In return, the Nevados de Cachi mountains Ojos del Salado  farther south is visible from Lllullaillaco. The region is dry and located at high altitudes, making work in the area difficult.

 farther east of Llullaillaco lies the Miocene Cerro Rosado volcano. It erupted dacitic lava flows on its northeastern and southern flanks during the Pliocene-Quaternary.  east of Llullaillaco, and behind Cerro Rosado is the Salar de Llullaillaco, a salt pan with warm springs at its western and southwestern shores. There are three abandoned borate mines Mina Amalia and the salt mines Mina Luisa and Mina Maria and the recent lithium prospect "Proyecto Mariana" at Salar de Llullaillaco. Mitral mountain lies southwest of Llullaillaco and is of Miocene age. It features an eroded crater that opens to the northwest. Iris  mountain north of Llullaillaco is constructed of Pliocene rocks. Other volcanoes in the neighbourhood are Dos Naciones, Cerro Silla, and Cerro 5074. Llullaillaco is associated with a local crustal upwarp.

The volcano 

It is formed by thick dacitic lava flows erupted during the Quaternary. These flows extend away from the volcano and form its summit. An older unit is formed by ignimbrites and pyroclastic flows. Older lava flows extend west from the volcano and are partly buried by sediments closer to the edifice.

The slopes high up are steeper than those at lower altitudes. A crater at  altitude was formed early in the development of the Llullaillaco volcano. Erosion has reduced it to a plateau. This crater is filled with snow and ice. The ice shows evidence of recent geothermal heating.

Large dacitic coulees emanate from the summit of the volcano and are young in appearance. One extends north of the volcano and the other one south. It almost reaches a road southwest of the volcano. These flows feature levees and ridges. At first they were considered to be Holocene, but argon-argon dating indicates they are of late Pleistocene age. Some traces of glacier activity are found in the summit area.

At least two stages of construction are recognized, Llullaillaco I and Llullaillaco II. The first stage originated from two centres and is now extensively degraded by glaciation and hydrothermal alteration. Its lava flows are less extensive than the ones of Llullaillaco I. Pyroclastic flow deposits with a composition similar to Llullaillaco II are found on the southern slope of the volcano and may have formed before the lava eruptions began.

Volcanism in the Central Volcanic Zone may be affected by deep-seated lineaments, which control where volcanoes and geothermal systems form. Such lineaments extend diagonally across the volcanic arc and are accompanied by volcanic manifestations at substantial distances from the arc. One of these lineaments, the Archibarca, runs beneath Llullaillaco and is also associated with the Escondida copper deposit,  Corrida de Cori, Archibarca, Antofalla, and the Galán caldera. Other lineaments include the Calama-El Toro.

Several dry valleys originate on Llullaillaco, including Quebrada de las Zorritas on the north-northeastern slope, Quebrada El Salado and Quebrada Llullaillaco on the northwestern slope, and Quebrada La Barda on the southwestern slope. The Quebrada Llullaillaco drains into the Salar de Punta Negra northwest of the volcano. The volcano is relatively unaffected by water erosion, water is only episodically present on the mountain. On the northwestern flank there is a  lake called the "Lago Llullaillaco" on the mountain; with an elevation of  it is one of the highest lakes in the world.

Two abandoned sulfur mines can be found north and south of Llullaillaco. The northern mine is known as Azufrera Esperanto and associated with an area of hydrothermal alteration. A path or road leads up to that mine from northwest.

Debris avalanche 

A major landslide occurred in the volcano's history during the late Pleistocene, probably triggered by volcanic activity. Part of the avalanche was channelled in a valley between Cerro Rosado and an unnamed volcano farther south. Part of the run-up avalanche later collapsed backwards over the main avalanche deposit. Unlike Socompa farther north, a landslide scar is only poorly developed at Llullaillaco despite the large size of the collapse; it was largely filled in later by lava flows and volcaniclastic debris.

Such ridges may be associated with uneven underlying terrain. Overall, the margins of the landslide are very crisp and the surface covered by hummocks.

This speed range is comparable to that of the Colima, Lastarria, and Mount St. Helens debris avalanches. The landslide occurred no later than 156,000 – 148,000 ± 5,000 years ago, it might coincide with the 48,000 year old lava flow. Some volcanic rocks were still hot at the time of the collapse, indicating that volcanic activity occurred immediately before the collapse. A smaller undated avalanche occurred on the northeastern flank.

Such landslides are common at volcanoes, where they are favoured by the steep edifices that form from lava flows being stacked on top of each other. It is not usually known what triggers the collapse, although eruption-associated earthquakes are suspected to play a role. Other volcanoes in the region with sector collapses are: Lastarria, Ollague, San Pedro, Socompa, and Tata Sabaya. The Mellado and Cerro Rosado volcanoes close to Llullaillaco also display evidence of sector collapses.

Glaciers and periglacial phenomena 

In 2006 the General Water Directorate of Chile stated that there were seven separate ice bodies on the mountain. Small glaciers are found above  altitude. Other sources contend there are no glaciers on Llullaillaco, which would make it the highest mountain in the world without one; although the existence of an ice slab on the western slope was reported in 1958 between  elevation and in 1992 there was an ice body which however lacked all evidence of glacial motion. However, Llullaillaco has snow fields tied to permafrost in the ground.  high penitentes occur above  altitude, especially in more sheltered areas.  high penitentes were observed in 1954. Snow covers the terrain above  altitude. Gullies that are found in the area probably result from meltwater runoff. The snowfields on Llullaillaco supply water to the Salar de Punta Negra. The lack of glaciers is a consequence of the dry climate, as the high insolation and dry air allow all snow to evaporate before it can form glaciers.

The existence of a cirque on the northwestern slope has been postulated. It was once believed that Llullaillaco had experienced three large glaciations, but the "moraines" are actually mudflow deposits. However, during the Pleistocene glaciers reached down to  altitude on the northwestern slope. Lava flows have overrun some of the glaciated surfaces and it is possible that lava flows induced the melting of glaciers. A number of glacial landforms elsewhere were destroyed by mudflows during the time of Llullaillaco's last activity. Llullaillaco may not have been glaciated at all during the Pleistocene.

There, solifluction and cryoplanation surfaces are developed, including lobe-shaped ground and block ramparts. These landforms have been mapped on the northwestern side of the volcano. Patterned ground is also common. Permafrost is found at higher altitudes. Cryoplanation and solifluction landforms are also observed on Iris and Mitral. Other than on periglacially influenced terrain, the ground at Llullaillaco is formed mostly by lavic rocks and block debris, which are frequently buried by tephra.

Composition 

Llullaillaco has mostly erupted dacites with medium potassium content, with rocks becoming more felsic the younger they are. Rock samples taken from Llullaillaco are mostly porphyritic or vitrophyric, with a glassy or microcrystalline matrix. Phenocrysts are mostly plagioclase, with mafic phenocrysts being dominated by orthopyroxene and smaller amounts of biotite, clinopyroxene, and hornblende. Ilmenite, magnetite, and sulfide minerals are also present, magnetite especially in the more oxidized older lavas. Some phenocrysts show evidence of a complex history. Quartz is rare. Older lavas have developed a red colour and contain oxidized iron in form of hematite. Lavas from Llullaillaco I are grey.

The rocks belong to the calc-alkaline series. Trace element data are typical for Central Volcanic Zone rocks. High potassium content is typical for shoshonite-like lavas erupted at large distance from the trenches.

The composition may reflect magma differentiation in a solitary magma chamber, but with occasional replenishment with more primitive magma. Magma mixing and plagioclase crystallization occurred in it. A lithospheric structure probably directed magma flows over long time periods along the same pathway. The depth of the magma source probably varied over the history of the volcano. The total magma output at Llullaillaco is about -.

Geological history 

The terrain around Llullaillaco consists of andesite and dacite lavas and pyroclastics of Miocene to Pliocene age. Some Oligocene-Miocene layers are exposed in the Quebrada de las Zorritas. Dates obtained by argon-argon dating range between 11.94 ± 0.13 and 5.48 ± 0.07 million years ago.  west of Llullaillaco do Paleozoic granites and volcanite rocks crop out. Elsewhere these layers are buried by Cenozoic rocks. There are several faults in the region, such as the Imilac-Salina del Fraile lineament whose movement has influenced the activity of Llullaillaco.

Research by J.P. Richards and M. Villeneuve has allowed the determination of the geological history of the region. In the late Miocene-Pliocene a phase of strong ignimbrite volcanism occurred. About 2 million years ago, the "Diaguita deformation" was characterized by a change in the deformation regimen from crustal shortening to strike-slip faulting and of volcanism from voluminous felsic eruptions to isolated stratovolcanoes and back-arc mafic volcanism. A slowdown in the subduction may have caused this change. Nowadays most volcanism occurs at the western edge of the Puna, where volcanoes such as Lascar and Llullaillaco formed.

Climate and biota 

The climate at Llullaillaco is cold and dry. Ground temperatures however can reach  during the day in summer. The temperature of the ground fluctuates strongly during the day.

Llullaillaco in 2004 became the site of the highest weather station in the world. The climate is extremely sunny on account of the lack of a cloud cover, the high altitude, and the close coincidence between summer solstice with the day where Earth is closest to the Sun. Precipitation is episodic to the point that it is difficult to give average values. It is most often associated with either convective or cyclonic activity during summer and winter respectively.

Between 24 and 25° degrees southern latitude the Andean Dry Diagonal crosses the Andes. At this latitude, half of the precipitation falls in summer and the other half in winter. The formation of this dry diagonal is an effect both of the rainshadow effect of the Andes, air subsidence within South Pacific High, and the cold Humboldt Current off the Pacific coast. This is the reason why the Atacama Desert exists. The extremely arid climate at Llullaillaco is also a consequence of these climatic effects.

Vegetation is scarce in the arid climate. Vegetation at Llullaillaco begins at  altitude with Acantholippia punensis, Atriplex imbricata, and Cristaria andicola. At this altitude, Adesmia spinosissima, Fabiana bryoides, Mulinum crassifolium, and Parastrephia quadrangularis are found in addition to the previously mentioned plants. Above  elevation there is no vegetation. This is the highest altitude in the world at which a mammal has been found to live.

Weakly developed fungal and bacterial communities have been found in the soils at Llullaillaco, with better developed algal and cyanobacterial communities found on the penitentes; some soil microbes may depend on volcanic carbon monoxide. Algae, lichens, microbial mats and vascular plants grow around and in Lago Llullaillaco. The environmental conditions in these soils are among the most extreme on the planet, with aridity, strong UV radiation, daily freeze-thaw cycles and a lack of nutrients. Organic material transported on the mountain by winds may be the principal source of food for some of these microorganisms. Air pollution from the Escondida copper mine may reach Llullaillaco and threaten ecosystems there.

Dry valleys and sheltered areas feature grasses. A permanent spring is found in Quebrada de las Zorritas. Deposits in this valley indicate that between 2,436.8 ± 49 and 1,593.1 ± 36 radiocarbon years ago runoff was more intense.

Archaeology 

Llullaillaco was first climbed by Inkas centuries ago. In 1999, a team of archeologists, led by Johan Reinhard, found three mummies of children on the top of Llullaillaco. At the time of their death they were six, seven, and fifteen years old. They were ostensibly human sacrifices offered to the gods of the Incan pantheon on mountaintops. In 2003 they were at the Catholic University of Salta, but starting from 2007 they can be found at the Museum of High Altitude Archaeology of Argentina.

The mummies were found buried  beneath an  large platform. The existence of ruins in the summit area had been reported during the first modern climb of the volcano in 1950.

Other archeological objects found along with the mummies included: headdresses with feathers, pottery, statues made out of gold and silver and textiles. A total of 145 objects were found together with the mummies. The hairs found with the mummies and as offerings accompanying the mummies have been subject of research to establish the background of the victims.

At least three paths lead up to Llullaillaco. The path is marked by cairns, probably to indicate where the path is when the volcano is covered by snow. The path ends at  altitude at the Portezuelo del Inca ruins, where a staircase begins. From these ruins one path goes to a cemetery at  altitude and another to the summit platform. The other path reaches two subrectangular walls  farther up, and continues to the platform where the mummies were found. These are the highest archeological sites in the world. The paths were discovered by Mathias Rebitsch in 1958.

Llullaillaco appears to have been the most important Inca sacred mountain in the region. Archeological sites are also found in the valleys that drain Llullaillaco towards the Salar de Punta Negra, including the Quebrada Llullaillaco and the Quebrada de las Zorritas. The paths connect with the major north–south axis that runs between San Pedro de Atacama and Copiapo. This axis is associated with the extensive Inca road system.

Eruptive history 

The volcano is about 1.45 ± 0.41 million years old, and Llullaillaco I is of early Pleistocene age. The oldest date, 1.5 ± 0.4 million years ago, was determined on a lava flow northwest of Llullaillaco's main edifice. Two dates obtained on lava flows of Llullaillaco II are 401,000 ± 6,000 and 1,500,000 ± 400,000 years ago, based on argon-argon dating and potassium-argon dating respectively. The northern young lava flow is less than one million years old based on potassium-argon dating, the southern flow is 48,000 ± 12,000 years old based on argon-argon dating on biotite.

Llullaillaco has been active in historical time, with the last eruption occurring in the late 19th century. Eruptions were recorded in February 1854, September 1868, and May 1877, involving two explosive eruptions and one with lava flows. According to a report in 1899, during the 1868 eruption large fissures opened on its slopes. The last eruption consisted of smoking reported at the time of the 1877 Iquique earthquake. Other reports mention eruptions in 1920, 1931, 1936 and 1960.

The volcano is currently considered dormant and there are no known fumaroles. Llullaillaco is considered Argentina's 16th most dangerous volcano out of 38. Future eruptive activity may result in the emission of pyroclastic flows and lava flows and may cause sector collapses, although they would be a small danger to human life, given that the area is sparsely inhabited.

See also 
 Llullaillaco National Park
 List of volcanoes in Chile
 List of volcanoes in Argentina
 List of Andean peaks with known pre-Columbian ascents
 List of volcanoes by elevation

References

Sources

Bibliography 
  
 Reinhard, Johan: The Ice Maiden: Inca Mummies, Mountain Gods, and Sacred Sites in the Andes. National Geographic Society, Washington, D.C., 2005.
 Reinhard, Johan and Ceruti, María Constanza: "Inca Rituals and Sacred Mountains: A Study of the World's Highest Archaeological Sites" Los Angeles: UCLA, 2010.
 Reinhard, Johan and Ceruti, María Constanza: Investigaciones arqueológicas en el Volcán Llullaillaco: Complejo ceremonial incaico de alta montaña. Salta: EUCASA, 2000.
 
 Ceruti, María Constanza: Llullaillaco: Sacrificios y Ofrendas en un Santuario Inca de Alta Montaña. Salta: EUCASA, 2003.
 
 Beorchia, Antonio: "El cementerio indígena del volcán Llullaillaco." Revista del Centro de Investigaciones Arqueológicas de Alta Montaña 2: 36–42, 1975, San Juan.
 
 
 Complete description, history, place name and routes of Llullaillaco in Andeshandbook
 Museum of High Mountain Archaeology

External links

Stratovolcanoes of Argentina
Stratovolcanoes of Chile
Atacama Desert
Volcanoes of Antofagasta Region
Volcanoes of Salta Province
Andean Volcanic Belt
Polygenetic volcanoes
Subduction volcanoes
Argentina–Chile border
International mountains of South America
Holocene stratovolcanoes
Pleistocene stratovolcanoes
Pleistocene South America
Quaternary South America
Six-thousanders of the Andes
Mountains of Antofagasta Region
Mountains of Salta Province
Puna de Atacama